Ostren i Vogël is a village in the former Ostren Municipality in Dibër County in northeastern Albania. At the 2015 local government reform it became part of the municipality Bulqizë. It is situated within the Gollobordë region.

Demographic history
Ostren i Vogël (Mali Ostrani) appears in the Ottoman defter of 1467 as a village in the timar of Karaca in the vilayet of Dulgoberda. The settlement had a total of seven households and the anthroponymy recorded attests to a mixed Albanian-Slavic character, with a slight predominance of Albanian personal names and patronyms (e.g., Kallam son of Gjergji, Nikolla son of Pelgrini). A certain Leka from Ohrid appears as among the household heads: Gjuro Luknisha, Mihoja son of Andrija, Gjureci son of Mihoja, Kallam son of Gjergji, Nikolla son of Pelgrini, Leka from Ohrid, and Gjureci son of Meksha.     

In an 1878 report, reflecting 1873 statistics, Ostren i Vogël was recorded as having 90 households with 155 Slavic Muslims (Pomaks) and 103 Bulgarian Christians.

In the early 20th century, Ostren i Vogël was a village with a mixed population of Bulgarian Muslims and Bulgarian Christians, according to Bulgarian geographer Vasil Kanchov's statistics. The Muslim population was prevalent, with 400 Bulgarian Muslims reported and 78 Bulgarian Christians. The "La Macédoine et sa Population Chrétienne" survey by Dimitar Mishev concluded that the Christian population in Malo-Ostreni in 1905 was composed of 120 Bulgarian Exarchists.

The village of Ostren i Vogël is inhabited by an Albanian population which dominates demographically in the village.
Other inhabitants of Ostren i Vogël are speakers of a south Slavic language (Macedonian) of whom in the village traditionally consist of a mixed Slavic Orthodox Christian (Macedonian) and Muslim (Torbeš) population.

References

Populated places in Bulqizë
Villages in Dibër County